GOES-11, known as GOES-L before becoming operational, is an American weather satellite, which is part of the US National Oceanic and Atmospheric Administration's Geostationary Operational Environmental Satellite system. It was launched in 2000, and operated at the GOES-WEST position, providing coverage of the west coast of the United States, until December 6, 2011.

Launch

GOES-L was launched aboard an International Launch Services Atlas IIA rocket, flying from Space Launch Complex 36A at the Cape Canaveral Air Force Station. The launch occurred at 07:07 UTC on 3 May. The launch was originally scheduled for 15 March 1999, however it was delayed to allow the Eutelsat W3 satellite to be launched first. Following this, it was rescheduled for 15 May. On 30 April, the Centaur upper stage of a Titan IV(401)B failed during the launch of USA-143. Since a version of the Centaur was also used on the Atlas II, the launch of GOES-L was delayed a week to ensure that the same problem would not affect its launch. Less than five days after the Titan failure, a Delta III failed to launch Orion 3. The failure occurred during the second stage restart, and as the Delta III and Atlas II both used RL10 engines on their second stages, this resulted in a further delay.

When the Centaur was cleared for flight in August 1999, GOES-L was rescheduled to launch in November. This then slipped to December in order to allow a UFO to launch ahead of it, before slipping again when a DSCS launch was added to the manifest. In January 2000, a launch date of 3 May was announced. The launch on 3 May occurred successfully, forty minutes into the launch window. It was built by Space Systems/Loral, based on the LS-1300 satellite bus, and was the fourth of five GOES-I series satellites to be launched.

Operations
Following launch, GOES-11 was positioned in geostationary orbit at a longitude of 104° West for testing and on-orbit storage. In 2006, it was moved to 135° West to replace the GOES-10 satellite, which was about to run out of fuel. By the time it entered service, it had already been in orbit for a year past the end of its design life. Its late entry into service was partly because GOES-10 exceeded its design life by over six years, and partly because GOES-12 was brought into service ahead of GOES-11 in order to allow use of a new instrument that it carried.

On December 6, 2011, GOES-11 was decommissioned and replaced by GOES-15.

See also

2000 in spaceflight
List of GOES satellites

References

Spacecraft launched in 2000
Satellites using the SSL 1300 bus
Geostationary Operational Environmental Satellites